Thomas Sandford (fl. 1597) was an English politician.

He was a Member (MP) of the Parliament of England for Carlisle in 1597.

References

Year of birth missing
Year of death missing
English MPs 1597–1598